CII or Cii may refer to:

 Chartered Insurance Institute
 Children's Institute International, a child-abuse organisation in Los Angeles
 Colour Index International
 Confederation of Indian Industry
 Construction Industry Institute
 Council of Islamic Ideology, Pakistan Government
 102 (number) in Roman numerals.
 George M. Low Center for Industrial Innovation, a research center at Rensselaer Polytechnic Institute
 Chaîne d'Information Internationale, former name of TV station France 24
 Computer-implemented inventions, see software patent
 Caldera International, Inc., a software company between 2001 and 2002
 Compagnie internationale pour l'informatique, French computer manufacturer, part of Plan Calcul
 Core Infrastructure Initiative, a project started by the Linux Foundation to fund critical open source projects
 Cross Industry Invoice, a technical specification developed in UN/CEFACT for creating message syntax used in global exchange between trading partners
 Centro Intelligence Interforze, an Italian intelligence agency

See also
 C2 (disambiguation), including a list of topics named C.II, etc.